Zerøspace was the second album from the Kidneythieves, released on March 26, 2002. It includes a slightly reworked version of their 1998 cover of Patsy Cline's "Crazy" which originally appeared on the Bride of Chucky soundtrack.

"Beføre I'm Dead" is featured on the soundtrack of the 2002 film, Queen of the Damned.

Track listing
All songs written by Kidneythieves, except where noted
Beføre I'm Dead – 4:36
Zerøspace – 3:50
Arsenal – 5:14
Mølten – 0:51
Black Bullet – 4:08
Dyskrasia – 4:21
Spank – 4:20
Glitter Girl – 4:15
Serene Dream – 3:36
Amnzerø – 2:07
Crazy (Willie Nelson) – 3:18
Placebø – 6:39
Take a Train [Awakening] – 2:21

Personnel
 Executive Producer – Yoshiki Hayashi

References

Zerøspace post on the Official website

2002 albums
Kidneythieves albums
Extasy Records albums